Silvert's Holdings Ltd., operating as Silvert's Adaptive Clothing & Footwear, is a U.S. and Canadian based retailer that designs and distributes adaptive clothing and footwear for men and women. The company makes a variety of types of adaptive apparel, including wheelchair clothing, easy access clothing as well as diabetic shoes, socks and slippers, designed to assist physically challenged individuals in their daily dressing and undressing.

History
In 1929, I.D Ed Alter founded Jack's Department Store in Ingersoll, Ontario, Canada. Jack's Department Store was initially a small town department store selling a range of products. After the death of I.D Alter, in 1978, his grandson, Jeffrey Alter joined the firm. In 1980, the company changed its name to Silvert's Clothing for Seniors and began specializing in adaptive clothing with Jeffrey Alter as CEO.

Silvert's opened its head office, warehouse and retail store in Concord, Ontario, Canada. Silvert's had its first mobile store on the road in 1981 and in 1987, its first catalog for adaptive clothing was introduced. Silvert's sold its products mainly through mental-health institutions before selling directly to customers.

Silvert's began expanding sales nationally for two years and started selling internationally in 1993. In 1995, Silvert's had 41 full-time employees and 15 part-time staff. Silvert's has since grown in recent years with a 9.01 out of 10 rating on ResellerRatings.com on June 15, 2018.

Silvert's was acquired by Strategic Partners Inc. in August of 2018

Products
Silvert's sells a wide variety of adaptive clothing ranging from wheelchair pants, shorts, open-back tops, dresses, nightwear, sportswear, and footwear, in addition to special-needs clothing accessories. Snap closures, elastic waists, Velcro closures are some of the features that Silvert's integrate when designing its adaptive wear.

Silvert's creates their own design in Canada but its clothing is manufactured in both Canada and China. 

Because many of Silvert's clothes are worn by people in home care facilities, Silvert's clothing and even some slippers are designed to hold up to industrial washers.

Sales and marketing
Silvert's mainly sells its products online and through catalogs that the company distributes twice a year. Silvert's online website allows the user to shop according to their specific disability and needs.

Silvert's uses social media such as Facebook where caregivers and family members can share ideas, experiences and reviews about Silvert's products and service. Silvert's also has a points-rewards system set up for its regular customers through which they can redeem their accumulated points.

Challenge Contest
In 2016, Silvert's participated in the Small Business Challenge contest sponsored by The Globe and Mail and Telus Corp. and was amongst the top 50 honorable-mention winners.

References

Adaptive clothing
Clothing brands of Canada
Online clothing retailers of Canada